Ross Newhan (born April 5, 1937) is an American former sports writer, best known as a columnist for the Long Beach Press-Telegram and baseball writer for the Los Angeles Times. He began his career in 1961 and retired in 2004.

Newhan garnered the 1997 Associated Press Sports Editors Award for his story on the sale of the Los Angeles Dodgers. In 1998, he was inducted into the Southern California Jewish Sports Hall of Fame. Newhan was the 2000 recipient of the J. G. Taylor Spink Award, given annually by the Baseball Writers' Association of America (BBWAA), and was honored during  ceremonies at the National Baseball Hall of Fame in Cooperstown, New York. He co-authored the book  Coaching Baseball Successfully.

His son, David Newhan, is a former Major League Baseball player and coach.

References

Further reading
 
 This chapter in Ruttman's history, based on a January 9, 2009, interview with Ross Newhan and a February 29, 2008, interview with David Newhan conducted for the book, discusses the Newhans' American, Jewish, baseball, and life experiences from youth to the present.

External links 
2000 J.G. Taylor Spink Award Winner Ross Newhan, National Baseball Hall of Fame

Living people
1930s births
Jewish American journalists
BBWAA Career Excellence Award recipients
Year of birth missing (living people)